Alfred Miodowicz (28 June 1929 – 17 September 2021) was a Polish politician and trade union activist. He was born in Poznań. A member of communist Polish United Workers Party, he held posts in the State National Council, Central Committee and Political Bureau. He was also the leader of the All-Poland Alliance of Trade Unions and took part in the Polish Round Table Agreement.

References

1929 births
2021 deaths
Politicians from Poznań
People from Poznań Voivodeship (1921–1939)
Members of the Politburo of the Polish United Workers' Party
Members of the Polish Sejm 1985–1989
Polish trade unionists
Polish Round Table Talks participants